The following is a list of significant earthquakes from 2021–2030, listing earthquakes of magnitude 7 and above, or which caused human fatalities. Deaths due to earthquake-caused tsunamis are included.

For lists of earthquakes by country, which may include smaller and less destructive events than those listed here, see Lists of earthquakes by country.

2021

2022

2023

All times are UTC, unless otherwise stated
ML = Richter magnitude scale 
Mw = Moment magnitude 
Mb = Body wave magnitude 
HRV = Harvard University (Global CMT) 
USGS = United States Geological Survey

See also
 List of earthquakes 2001–2010
 List of earthquakes 2011–2020

References

2021–2030
2020s-related lists